This is a list of protected areas in Thailand:

National parks in the Thai highlands

 Chae Son National Park
 Doi Chong National Park
 Doi Inthanon National Park
 Doi Khun Tan National Park
 Doi Luang National Park
 Doi Pha Hom Pok National Park
 Doi Pha Klong National Park
 Doi Phu Kha National Park
 Doi Phu Nang National Park
 Doi Suthep-Pui National Park
 Doi Wiang Pha National Park
 Huai Nam Dang National Park
 Kaeng Chet Khwae National Park
 Khao Kho National Park
 Khlong Lan National Park
 Khlong Wang Chao National Park
 Khun Chae National Park
 Khun Khan National Park
 Khun Nan National Park
 Khun Phra Wo National Park
 Khun Sathan National Park
 Lam Nam Nan National Park
 Lam Nam Kok National Park
 Lan Sang National Park
 Mae Charim National Park
 Mae Moei National Park
 Mae Ngao National Park
 Mae Phang National Park
 Mae Puem National Park
 Mae Ping National Park
 Mae Ta Krai National Park
 Mae Tho National Park
 Mae Wa National Park
 Mae Wang National Park
 Mae Wong National Park
 Mae Yom National Park
 Na Haeo National Park
 Nam Nao National Park
 Namtok Chat Trakan National Park 
 Namtok Mae Surin National Park
 Namtok Pha Charoen National Park
 Nanthaburi National Park
 Op Khan National Park
 Op Luang National Park
 Pha Daeng National Park
 Phu Hin Rong Kla National Park
 Phu Langka National Park
 Phu Sang National Park
 Phu Soi Dao National Park
 Salawin National Park
 Si Lanna National Park
 Si Nan National Park 
 Si Satchanalai National Park
 Taksin Maharat National Park
 Tham Pha Thai National Park
 Tham Pla–Namtok Pha Suea National Park
 Tham Sakoen National Park
 Thung Salaeng Luang National Park
 Ton Sak Yai National Park
 Wiang Kosai National Park

National parks in Isan and adjacent areas

 Huai Huat National Park
 Kaeng Tana National Park
 Khao Phra Wihan National Park
 Khao Yai National Park
 Mukdahan National Park
 Na Haeo National Park
 Na Yung-Nam Som National Park
 Nam Phong National Park
 Pang Sida National Park
 Pa Hin Ngam National Park
 Pha Taem National Park
 Phu Chong–Na Yoi National Park
 Phu Kao–Phu Phan Kham National Park
 Phu Kradueng National Park
 Phu Laen Kha National Park
 Phu Pha Lek National Park
 Phu Pha Man National Park
 Phu Pha Yon National Park
 Phu Phan National Park
 Phu Ruea National Park
 Phu Sa Dok Bua National Park
 Phu Suan Sai National Park
 Phu Wiang National Park
 Sai Thong National Park
 Ta Phraya National Park
 Tat Mok National Park
 Tat Ton National Park
 Thap Lan National Park

National parks in western, central and eastern Thailand

 Chaloem Phrakiat Thai Prachan National Park
 Chaloem Rattanakosin National Park
 Erawan National Park
 Kaeng Krachan National Park
 Khao Chamao–Khao Wong National Park
 Khao Khitchakut National Park
 Khao Laem National Park
 Khao Sip Ha Chan National Park
 Khuean Srinagarindra National Park
 Khun Phra Wo National Park
 Kui Buri National Park
 Lam Khlong Ngu National Park
 Namtok Chet Sao Noi National Park
 Namtok Huai Yang National Park
 Namtok Khlong Kaeo National Park
 Namtok Pha Charoen National Park
 Namtok Phlio National Park
 Namtok Sam Lan National Park
 Pang Sida National Park
 Phra Phutthachai National Park
 Phu Toei National Park
 Ramkhamhaeng National Park
 Sai Yok National Park
 Thong Pha Phum National Park

National parks in southern Thailand

 Bang Lang National Park
 Budo-Sungai Padi National Park
 Kaeng Krung National Park
 Khao Lak-Lam Ru National Park
 Khao Luang National Park
 Khao Nam Khang National Park
 Khao Nan National Park
 Khao Phanom Bencha National Park
 Khao Pu–Khao Ya National Park
 Khao Sok National Park
 Khlong Phanom National Park
 Namtok Ngao National Park
 Namtok Sai Khao National Park
 Namtok Si Khid National Park
 Namtok Yong National Park
 Si Phang-nga National Park
 Sirinat National Park
 Tai Rom Yen National Park
 Thale Ban National Park

Marine national parks

 Ao Phang Nga 
 Hat Wanakon
 Hat Chao Mai
 Hat Nai Yang
 Hat Nopharat Thara-Mu Ko Phi Phi
 Khao Laem Ya-Mu Ko Samet
 Khao Lampi–Hat Thai Mueang
 Khao Sam Roi Yot
 Laem Son
 Lam Nam Kra Buri
 Mu Ko Ang Thong
 Mu Ko Chang
 Mu Ko Chumphon
 Mu Ko Lanta
 Mu Ko Phetra
 Mu Ko Ranong
 Mu Ko Similan
 Mu Ko Surin
 Tarutao
 Than Bok Khorani

Wildlife sanctuaries

 Buntharik - Khao Yot Mon Wildlife Sanctuary
 Chiang Dao Wildlife Sanctuary
 Doi Pha Chang Wildlife Sanctuary
 Doi Pha Muang Wildlife Sanctuary
 Dong Yai Wildlife Sanctuary
 Hala Bala Wildlife Sanctuary
 Hua Tabtan Hadsamran Wildlife Sanctuary
 Huai Kha Khaeng Wildlife Sanctuary
 Huai Sala Wildlife Sanctuary
 Khao Ang Rue Nai Wildlife Sanctuary
 Khao Khiao - Khao Chomphu Wildlife Sanctuary
 Khao Phra Thaeo Wildlife Sanctuary
 Khao Sanam Priang Wildlife Sanctuary
 Khao Soi Dao Wildlife Sanctuary
 Khlong Nakha Wildlife Sanctuary
 Khlong Phraya Wildlife Sanctuary
 Khlong Saeng Wildlife Sanctuary
 Khlong Yan Wildlife Sanctuary
 Lam Nam Nan Phang Kha Wildlife Sanctuary
 Lum Nam Pai Wildlife Sanctuary
 Mae Charim Wildlife Sanctuary
 Mae Lao-Mae Sae Wildlife Sanctuary
 Mae Nam Phachi Wildlife Sanctuary
 Mae Tuen Wildlife Sanctuary
 Mae Yom Phang Khwa Wildlife Sanctuary
 Nam Pat Wildlife Sanctuary
 Om Koi Wildlife Sanctuary
 Phanom Dong Rak Wildlife Sanctuary
 Phu Khat Wildlife Sanctuary
 Phu Khiao Wildlife Sanctuary
 Phu Luang Wildlife Sanctuary
 Phu Miang-Phu Thong Wildlife Sanctuary
 Phu Pha Daeng Wildlife Sanctuary
 Phu Wua Wildlife Sanctuary
 Salak Pra Wildlife Sanctuary
 Salawin Wildlife Sanctuary
 Sap Langka Wildlife Sanctuary
 Tabo-Huai Yai Wildlife Sanctuary
 Thungyai Naresuan Wildlife Sanctuary
 Ton Nga-Chang Wildlife Sanctuary
 Ton Pariwat Wildlife Sanctuary
 Umphang Wildlife Sanctuary
 Yot Dom Wildlife Sanctuary

Forest parks

 Bantak Petrified Forest Park
 Khao Kradong Forest Park
 Khao Laem Sing Forest Park
 Khao Phang Forest Park
 Kosamphi Forest Park
 Namron Huai Mak Liam Forest Park
 Namtok Huai Lao Forest Park
 Namtok Hua Mae Kham Forest Park
 Namtok Huai Mae Sak Forest Park
 Namtok Khun Kon Forest Park
 Namtok Mae Tho Forest Park
 Namtok Pong Phra Bat Forest Park
 Namtok Raman Forest Park
 Namtok Sai Khao Forest Park
 Namtok Si Chomphu Forest Park
 Namtok Than Ngam Forest Park
 Namtok Than Thip Forest Park
 Namtok Thara Sawan Forest Park
 Namtok Tat Khwan Forest Park
 Phae Mueang Phi Forest Park
 Phaya Pipak Forest Park 
 Phnom Sawai Forest Park
 Phu Chi Fa Forest Park
 Phu Faek Forest Park
 Phu Langka Forest Park
 Phu Mu Forest Park
 Phu Muang Forest Park
 Phu Pha Lom Forest Park
 Phu Phra Bat Buabok Forest Park
 Pran Buri Forest Park
 Pratan Dongrung Forest Park
 Sa Nang Manora Forest Park
 San Pha Phaya Phrai Forest Park
 Tham Luang - Khun Nam Nang Non Forest Park
 Tung Bua Tong Forest Park

Other protected areas

 Ao Khung Kraben Non-hunting Area
 Ban Chiang archaeological site
 Ban Yang Non-hunting Area
 Bo Pho Thi–Pak Thong Chai Non-hunting Area
 Bueng Boraphet Non-hunting Area
 Bueng Khong Long Non-hunting Area
 Don Hoi Lot
 Dong Khlo–Huai Kapo Non-hunting Area
 Huai Phueng–Wang Yao Non-hunting Area
 Khao Kho Non-hunting Area
 Khao Noi–Khao Pradu Non-hunting Area
 Khao Phanom Thong Non-hunting Area
 Khao Somphot Non-hunting Area
 Khao Tha Phet Non-hunting Area
 Khao Yai–Khao Na Pha Tang and Khao Ta Phrom Non-hunting Area
 Khu Khut Water Fowl Park
 Krabi River Estuary
 Kraburi River Estuary
 Mae Salit - Pong Daeng Forestry Reserve
 Nong Han Kumphawapi Lake
 Nong Thung Thong Non-hunting Area
 Pha Nam Thip Non-hunting Area
 Phanom Rung historical park
 Phu San Khiao Non-hunting Area
 Phutthabat Chon Daen Non-hunting Area
 Song Khwae Non-hunting Area
 Tha Daeng Non-hunting Area
 Thale Noi Non-hunting Area
 Tham Pha Tha Phon Non-hunting Area
 Wang Pong–Chon Daen Non-hunting Area

See also
 List of Ramsar wetlands of Thailand
 Environmental issues in Thailand
 List of caves in Thailand
 Mekong River Protected areas
 IUCN Protected Area Management Categories
 Historical parks of Thailand
 List of Protected Areas Regional Offices of Thailand

References

External links

 List of Forest Parks in Thailand
 Map of National Parks & Wildlife Sanctuaries in Thailand
 National Parks & Wildlife Sanctuaries in Thailand
 Wildlife sanctuaries of Thailand
 Paleontological parks and museums and prominent fossil sites in Thailand

Protected areas